Lefki may refer to several places in Greece:

Lefki, Ithaca, a village on the Strait of Ithaca
Lefki, Karditsa, a village in the Karditsa regional unit, part of the municipal unit Fyllo
Lefki, Kastoria, a village in the Kastoria regional unit, part of the municipal unit Agia Triada
Lefki, Larissa, a village of the Elassona municipality
Lefki, Lasithi, a municipality in Lasithi, Crete
an alternative name of Koufonisi, Crete, an archipelago south of Crete
a village in Evmoiro, Xanthi, Greece